Martyn Bates (born 1960) is an English singer, musician and songwriter.

Bates grew up listening to English folk music before as a teenager becoming excited by punk, getting involved in the more diverse and experimental post-punk scene. After releasing tapes of experimental, industrial music as Migraine Inducers he formed Eyeless In Gaza with Peter Becker in January 1980. The duo became known for their unconventional instrumentation and arrangements, and for Bates’s passionate vocals, which at times were whispered, howled, or stammered. Eyeless In Gaza released six albums on Cherry Red Records.  These were Photographs as Memories (1981), Caught in Flux (1981), Pale Hands I Loved So Well (1982), Drumming the Beating Heart (1982), Rust Red September (1983) and Back from the Rains, and then went on hiatus until 1992.

Picking up from 1982’s acclaimed Letters Written (1982) solo album, Bates then concentrated mostly on solo work for a while, going on to collaborate with Anne Clark (Just After Sunset 1998) – also starting the short-lived bands Cry Acetylene Angel, Hungry I, and The Sing Circus (with This Mortal Coil ’s Deirdre Rutkowski). He contributed to Derek Jarman's soundtracks The Garden and The Last of England. Then he temporarily relocated his main focus to Europe, releasing three solo albums on the Belgian based Antler Subway label – Love Smashed on a Rock (1988), Letters to a Scattered Family (1990) and Stars Come Trembling (1990), which musically offered initial glimpses of the acoustic folk roots of his youth.

In 1993, Bates began working with former Napalm Death drummer Mick Harris, collaborating on a three album series of Murder Ballads, creating an innovative  marriage of “isolationist” ambience with folk-song form. In the same time frame Bates created a virtually a cappella work – a two volume series of “song-settings” of James Joyce's chamber music Chamber Music cycle of 36 poems (released in 1994 and 1996).

From 1992 onwards, Bates has run a parallel career recording and performing with a re-vitalised Eyeless In Gaza – with Eyeless deftly blending song with collaged soundscaping - while Bates otherwise continues to develop his own intense and possibly autobiographical solo work.

Bates’s solo outings of particular note include the albums Imagination Feels Like Poison (1997), Arriving Fire (2014), and I Said To Love (2018). As Twelve Thousand Days, since 2000 Bates has also worked with Orchis/Temple Music/Nurse With Wound collaborator Alan Trench - producing five albums of “channelled wyrd folk, psych-musics & other curios”, including the forthcoming album Field’s End (2020).

Bates is the author of five books of “lyrics to songs heard and unheard, and other gathered miscellany”.

Discography
Solo albumsDissonance/Antagonistic Music (cassette as Migraine Inducers), 1979Letters Written (10" album), 1982The Return of the Quiet, 1987Love Smashed on a Rock, 1989Letters to a Scattered Family, 1990Stars Come Trembling, 1990Port of Stormy Lights (Sordide Sentimental, booklet by J.P. Turmel with CD), 1990Chamber Music 1, 1994Mystery Seas, 1995Chamber Music 2, 1996Imagination Feels Like Poison, 1997Dance of Hours, 2001Your Jewelled Footsteps (solo and collaboration works 1979–2006) (compilation), 2006A Map of the Stars in Summer (lyric book with CD), 2008Unsung, 2012Arriving Fire, 2015Fireworks & Jewels/The Colour of Amber, 2016I Said to Love, 2017

BooksImagination Feels Like Poison, 1997Plague of Years, 2000A Map of the Stars in Summer, 2008Notes on Mythic Language, 2015November: Inky Blue Sky, 2015

Anne Clark & Martyn BatesJust After Sunset – The Poetry of Rainer Maria Rilke, 1998

Martyn Bates & M.J. HarrisMurder Ballads (Drift), 1994Murder Ballads (Passages), 1997Murder Ballads (Incest Songs), 1998

Twelve Thousand Days (Martyn Bates & Alan Trench)In the Garden of Wild Stars, 2000The Devil in the Grain, 2001At the Landgate, CD-Ep 2005From the Walled Garden, 2006Insect Silence, 2018The Birds Sing as Bells, 2022

Martyn Bates & Troum
To a Child Dancing in the Wind, 2006

Martyn Bates & Max Eastley
Songs of Transformation, 2007

Sorry For Laughing (Gordon H. Whitlow/Ed Ka-Spel/Martyn Bates)
 See It Alone, 2020
 Remember, You Are An Actor, 2021

as KODAX STROPHES/MARTYN BATES

It Doesn't Matter Where It's Solstice When You're In The Room, 2020
Post-War Baby, 2021

References

English male singer-songwriters
English male musicians
British post-punk musicians
1960 births
Living people